Gearon is a surname. Notable people with the surname include:

Eamonn Gearon, British author, Arabist, and analyst 
Tierney Gearon (born 1963), American photographer
Valerie Gearon (1937–2003), Welsh actress